Soup dumpling may refer to:

 A dumpling served in soup or with liquid filling, such as:
 any type of jiaozi, a Chinese dumpling, when served in soup
 Wonton, a Chinese dumpling usually served in soup
 Khinkali, a Georgian dumpling with a filling, traditionally of minced meat and broth
 Other pastries served in soup or with liquid filling, such as:
 Xiaolongbao, a small Chinese-styled steamed bun filled with soup
 Tang bao, a large Chinese-style steamed bun filled with soup